Il birichino di papà ("The fluffy dad") is a 1942 Italian "white-telephones" comedy film written and directed by Raffaello Matarazzo. It is an adaptation of the 1905 novel Papas Junge by Henny Koch.

Cast 

Armando Falconi as Leopoldo Giovannini 
Chiaretta Gelli as  Nicoletta 
Amelia Chellini as  Elisa Giovannini 
Dina Galli as  Marquise Della Bella
Anna Vivaldi as  Livia Giovannini 
Franco Scandurra as  Roberto Della Bella 
Nicoletta Parodi as  Irene Della Bella 
Paola Borboni as  The College Director
Carlo Campanini as  Lawyer De Marchi
Enrico Luzi as  Gegè 
Renato Chiantoni as  Man at the phone with Nicoletta

References

External links

1942 films
1942 comedy films
Films directed by Raffaello Matarazzo
Italian comedy films
Films scored by Nino Rota
Italian black-and-white films
Films with screenplays by Cesare Zavattini
Lux Film films
1940s Italian films
1940s Italian-language films